Stream of Consciousness is a concept album by the Italian progressive power metal band Vision Divine. The album was released in 2004  on Metal Blade Records.

Track listing
All music written by Olaf Thörsen (Magnani) and Oleg Smirnoff. All vocal melodies written by Fabio Lione (Tordiglione) except tracks 6 (refrain), 7 (verse), 8, 9, 10 & 14, written by Michele Luppi. All lyrics written by Olaf Thörsen.

 "Chapter I: Stream of Unconsciousness" (0:59) 
 "Chapter II: The Secret Of Life" (5:09)
 "Chapter III: Colours Of My World" (7:25)
 "Chapter IV: In The Light" (Instrumental) (1:23)
 "Chapter V: The Fallen Feather" (5:50)
 "Chapter VI: La Vita Fugge" (4:30)
 "Chapter VII: Versions Of The Same" (4:38)
 "Chapter VIII: Through The Eyes Of God" (4:31)
 "Chapter IX: Shades" (5:27)
 "Chapter X: We Are, We Are Not" (5:35)
 "Chapter XI: Fool's Garden" (Instrumental) (1:59)
 "Chapter XII: The Fall Of Reason" (Instrumental) (1:50)
 "Chapter XIII: Out Of The Maze" (6:28)
 "Chapter XIV: Identities"  (5:36)

Personnel
Michele Luppi - vocals
Olaf Thörsen - guitars 
Oleg Smirnoff - keyboards 
Andrea "Tower" Torricini - bass 
Matteo Amoroso - drums

References

2004 albums
Vision Divine albums
Concept albums
Metal Blade Records albums